Bourcq is a commune in the Ardennes department in the Grand Est region of northern France.

Population

In 2017, the town had 52 residents.

See also
Communes of the Ardennes department

References

Communes of Ardennes (department)
Ardennes communes articles needing translation from French Wikipedia